Bishop John Joseph "J.J." McCarthy C.S.Sp. (27 April 1896 – 13 January 1983), was an Irish born, Holy Ghost Father, who served as Bishop to Nairobi, Kenya.

Born 28 April 1896 in Doonegan, Milltown Malbay, Co. Clare, 'J.J' was a student at Rockwell College, before going on to Kimmage Manor to train as a priest. He studied at St. Marys, and University College Dublin (obtaining a BA), and was a prefect in Blackrock College. At Rockwell, he played rugby and also played rugby in Blackrock. He was ordained in 1925, and following ordination, he went on his mission to East Africa.

He was ordained bishop in 1946 with the old title of Vicar Apostolic of Zanzibar (succeeding another Irish Spiritan John William Heffernan) and Titular Bishop of Cercina. In 1953 he was appointed Archbishop of Nairobi, and position he held until his retirement in 1971.

He served as president of the Kenya Conference of Catholic Bishops from 1969 to 1970.

He retired in 1972 and returned to Ireland, where he lived in Kildare for a time before moving to Kimmage Manor, where he died in 1983.

References

1896 births
1983 deaths
20th-century Roman Catholic bishops in Kenya
Roman Catholic missionaries in Kenya
Roman Catholic bishops of Nairobi
Irish expatriate Catholic bishops
Holy Ghost Fathers
Irish Spiritans
People educated at Rockwell College
Alumni of University College Dublin
People from County Clare
People educated at Blackrock College
Roman Catholic archbishops of Nairobi